Refstad-Veitvet Idrettslag was a Norwegian sports club from Oslo.

It was founded in 1985 as a merger between Refstad IL (founded 1946) and Veitvet IL (founded 1955). It was especially known for its team handball section. Refstad IL had won several handball championships for men between 1974 and 1979. Players included Harald Tyrdal, Sven-Tore Jacobsen and Per Otto Furuseth. The club later went defunct. A new club named Veitvet SK was later founded.

References

Defunct Norwegian handball clubs
Defunct football clubs in Norway
Football clubs in Oslo
Sport in Oslo
Sports clubs established in 1946
1985 establishments in Norway